Eloise is a female given name, the English version of the French  name  Éloïse or Héloïse. It is of uncertain meaning but may be derived from the Old German name  Helewidis , which meant “healthy” and “wide.”  A Portuguese form of the name is Heloísa, which is currently among the most popular names for girls in Brazil. Heloisa is used in the Czech, German, and Slovak languages. The Italian version of the name is  Eloisa and the Spanish version of the name is  Eloísa.

It may refer to:

People named Eloise 

 Eloise, alternative spelling of Héloïse (1090?/1100–1? – 1164), French nun, writer, scholar, and abbess, lover of Peter Abélard
Eloise Baza (1953–2007), President of the Guam Chamber of Commerce (1984–2007)
Eloise Broady (b. 1957), American model and actress
Eloise Hughes Smith (1893–1940), survivor of the 1912 Titanic Disaster
Eloise Jones (1917–2004), Canadian politician
Eloise Klein Healy, American poet
Eloise Laws, American singer
Eloise Lewis (1920–1999), the first dean of the School of Nursing at the University of North Carolina at Greensboro
Eloise McGraw (1915–2000), American children's writer
Eloise Mignon, Australian actress
Countess Eloise of Orange-Nassau, Jonkvrouwe van Amsberg, member of the Dutch Royal Family

 Eloise Quiñones Keber, Professor of Art at Baruch College
Eloise Southby-Halbish, sports commentator and former Australian netball player
Eloise Wellings, Australian long distance runner
Eloise Worledge, Australian girl who went missing in 1976
Elouise P. Cobell, a widely recognised Native American leader
Eloise Taylor, eldest daughter of the Lady Helen Taylor, who is a member of the extended British Royal Family
Lady Eloise Gordon-Lennox (born 2000), younger daughter of Charles Gordon-Lennox, 11th Duke of Richmond.

People named Eloisa

 Eloisa Garcia Tamez, co-founder of the Lipan Apache Women Defense/Strength to protect sacred Native American sites
 Eloisa James, pen name of Mary Bly
 Eloísa Ibarra, Uruguayan artist
 Eloisa Biasotto Mano (1924–2019), Brazilian chemist, professor

Notes

See also
Eloise (disambiguation)

Feminine given names

fr:Héloïse
it:Eloisa